This page details the match results and statistics of the Colombia national football team from 2000 to 2019.

Key

Key to matches
Att.=Match attendance
(H)=Home ground
(A)=Away ground
(N)=Neutral ground

Key to record by opponent
Pld=Games played
W=Games won
D=Games drawn
L=Games lost
GF=Goals for
GA=Goals against

Results

Colombia's score is shown first in each case.

Record by opponent

References

Colombia national football team results